Mercer County Schools is a school district serving Mercer County, Kentucky, headquartered in Harrodsburg.

Prior to 2006 Harrodsburg Independent Schools superintendent Dr. H.N. Snodgrass proposed a merger to the Mercer county school authorities because of the declining enrollment in his district; they were initially hesitant but later agreed. The Harrodsburg school system merged into the Mercer County Schools in 2006.

Schools
 Mercer County Senior High School
 King Middle School
 Mercer County Intermediate School
 Mercer Elementary School

References

External links
 Mercer County Schools
Education in Mercer County, Kentucky
School districts in Kentucky